Re-recording is the process by which the audio track of a film or video production is created. An audio re-recording is often called a re-recording of music. As sound elements are mixed and combined the process necessitates "re-recording" all the audio elements, such as dialogue, music, sound effects, by the sound re-recording mixer(s) to achieve the desired result, which is the final soundtrack that the audience hears, when the finished film is played.

Film and video technology
Filmmaking